The Colonial Mexican Period lasted from 1521 to 1821 during the Vice-Regency of New Spain. The cultivation of European music began soon after the arrival of the Spanish, during the Late-Renaissance period of Western Music. Musical practices continually coincided with European tendencies throughout the subsequent Baroque and Classical music periods. It is important to note that while much music was fashioned in European style, uniquely Mexican hybrid works composed of native Mexican language and European musical practice, appeared as early as the sixteenth century, and throughout the colonial period.

Much of the surviving music is sacred music for choir and orchestra that was found at the cathedrals of Mexico City, Puebla, Oaxaca, Morelia, and Guatemala City, when it formed part of New Spain. Collections of secular music also survive such as the Códice Saldívar of guitar music, and the Eleanor Hague Manuscript housed at the Southwestern Museum in Los Angeles.

Renaissance Music

Antonio de Salazar

Hernando Franco

Baroque Music

Manuel de Zumaya

Ignacio de Jerusalem

Classical Music

Manuel Arenzana

José Antonio del Corral

Mexican music